The 1944 Montana gubernatorial election took place on November 7, 1944. Incumbent Governor of Montana Sam C. Ford, who was first elected Governor in 1940, ran for re-election. He won the Republican primary and moved on to the general election, where he was opposed by Leif Erickson, a former Chief Justice of the Montana Supreme Court and the Democratic nominee. Although then-President Franklin D. Roosevelt comfortably won the state in that year's presidential election, Ford defeated Erickson by a wide margin to win his second and final term as governor.

Democratic primary

Candidates
Leif Erickson, former Chief Justice of the Montana Supreme Court
Austin B. Middleton, chairman of the Montana Railroad and Public Service Commission
Roy E. Ayers, former Governor of Montana

Results

Republican primary

Candidates
Sam C. Ford, incumbent Governor of Montana
Jacob Thorkelson, former United States Congressman from Montana's 1st congressional district

Results

General election

Results

References

Montana
Gubernatorial
1944
November 1944 events